Edmonton—Spruce Grove was a federal electoral district in Alberta, Canada, that was represented in the House of Commons of Canada from 2004 to 2015. It was a suburban riding in Edmonton.

The electoral district was created in 2003 from St. Albert, Edmonton Southwest and Edmonton West ridings. It was abolished in 2013. Most of the Edmonton portion became part of a recreated Edmonton West, with a small portion transferring to Edmonton Centre. The suburban portion became part of Sturgeon River—Parkland.

Member of Parliament

This riding elected the following Member of Parliament:

Its only Member of Parliament for the duration of the riding's existence was Rona Ambrose, a former columnist and communication consultant, who was first elected to Parliament in the 2004 election as a member of the Conservative Party of Canada. She served as the Minister of Public Works and Government Services, Minister of the Environment, Minister of Intergovernmental Affairs, Minister of Labour, Minister responsible for the Status of Women, Minister of Western Economic Diversification, President of the Queen's Privy Council for Canada, and Minister of Health most recently. In the 2004-2005 parliamentary session, she served as a member of the Legislative Committee on Bill C-38, Standing Committee on Finance, Standing Committee on Foreign Affairs and International Trade, and the Subcommittee on Fiscal Imbalance of the Standing Committee on Finance.

After the riding was dissolved in 2013, Ambrose went on to seek election in the new riding of Sturgeon River—Parkland in 2015, which she won.

Election results

	

 	

Note: Change based on redistributed results. Conservative vote is compared to the total of Progressive Conservative and Canadian Alliance vote in 2000.

See also
 List of Canadian federal electoral districts
 Past Canadian electoral districts

References
 
 
 Expenditures - 2008
 Expenditures - 2004

Notes

Former federal electoral districts of Alberta
Politics of Edmonton
Spruce Grove